Jason Clark may refer to:

 Jason Clark (darts player) (born 1969), British darts player
 Jason Clark (rugby league) (born 1989), Australian rugby league player
 Jason Clark (basketball) (born 1990), American basketball player
 J. Clark (Jason Crowe Clark), American musician

See also
 Jason Clarke (disambiguation)
 Jay Clark (disambiguation)